Third Party Risk is a 1953 crime novel by the British writer Nicolas Bentley. While holidaying near Marseilles author Philip Geiger is rescued from drowning by a fellow guest at the hotel who soon embroils him in a series of events that lead to murder.

Film adaptation
In 1954 it was made into film of the same title directed by Daniel Birt and starring Lloyd Bridges, Simone Silva and Finlay Currie.

References

Bibliography
 Goble, Alan. The Complete Index to Literary Sources in Film. Walter de Gruyter, 1999.
 Reilly, John M. Twentieth Century Crime & Mystery Writers. Springer, 2015.

1953 British novels
British crime novels
British thriller novels
British mystery novels
British novels adapted into films
Michael Joseph books
Novels set in London
Novels set in France